Outsold is the second studio album by Norwegian heavy metal band Tonic Breed. It was released on April 28, 2014. Outsold was the first album by Tonic Breed to feature Thomas Koksvik and Mats Johansen.

Background and recording
In the fall of 2011, Tonic Breed joined a live competition in Sarpsborg, Norway. Tonic Breed won it, and the prize was a given recording time at Lydlageret Studios, Sarpsborg. At that time, Tonic Breed had barely started writing new songs after their first release, so they put the studio on hold.

In November 2013, Tonic Breed started recording their second studio album, Outsold, in Lydlageret studio in Sarpsborg. They finished the recording mid December. The studio tech in Lydlageret was Lars Andresen and the album was pre-mixed by Patrik Svendsen and Andresen. The album was then sent to Toproom Studios, Norway, to do the final mix and mastering.

Sound engineer at Toproom Studios was Børge Finstad.

Music videos
A week after the album release, the third song on the album, Bad Company, was released with its own first music video. The video includes both video material directed by Patrik Svendsen, and animation made by Ole Andersen.

In May 2015, Tonic Breed released a second music video to the song, Strife. It was directed by Oscar Birk. The video was the first project to involve new lead guitarist, Jørgen Abrahamsen. On drums were Niklas Skjelin as a guest appearance.

In late January 2016, Tonic Breed released "Fifth Estate" as the third and last music video from the "Outsold" album. It was directed by Oscar Birk. The video was the first project since 2012 to involve Daniel Pettersen on drums.

Track listing

Personnel

Tonic Breed
 Patrik Svendsen – Lead Vocals, Rhythm Guitar
 Rudi Golimo – Bass guitar, Backing Vocals
 Thomas Koksvik – Lead Guitar, Backing Vocals
 Mats Johansen – Drums

Technical Personnel
 Patrik Svendsen And Lars Andresen – Producer, Mixing
 Børge Finstad – Engineer
 Anne Marthe Strand – Cover Illustration

Guests
 Andreas Nergård – Orchestration Intro On "Strife"

References

External links
 Tonic Breed's official website

Tonic Breed albums
2014 albums